Dear Annie may refer to:
 Annie's Mailbox, an advice column written by Ann Landers' former editors from 2002 to 2016
 "Dear Annie", a story written by John Wagner
 Dear Annie, an advice column written by Annie Lane